Glyn M. Owen is an English composer.

He has written music for companies such as Olympus, Volvo, Disney and Ferrari. He has also produced and composed music featuring in British and American TV shows including The Oprah Winfrey Show and the BBC's The One Show.

The music he has composed for commercials has led to winning a number of awards, including a Golden Lion at the Cannes Lions International Festival of Creativity.

Early life
Owen was born and raised in Worcestershire, England. He was educated at the Royal College of Music in London, where he achieved a Master's degree in Film Composition. While studying at the Royal College of Music his tutor was Joseph Horovitz.

Career

Adverts
Throughout his career, Owen has composed music for a number of companies including Audi, BBC, BMW, Braun, Disney, Ferrari, Gillette, ITV, Mercedes, Nivea, Olympus and Sky Italia. The vast majority of this work has been music for adverts.

Springer & Jacoby International created an advert for Olympus in 2005 titled Red-Eyed Baby, which was directed by Noam Murro. The ad featured a baby with red eyes that advertised one of the latest digital cameras. The music for the ad was composed by Owen and went on to win a Gold Lion at Cannes. He also composed for the ad "Distorted Dogs", which was also created by Springer & Jacoby International and again directed by Noam Murro. This also went on to win a Gold Lion in 2005. During the same year, the advert "Distorted Dogs" for Olympus also won 1st prize for London's International Advertising Award in the same year. It also went on to win Silver at the Epica Awards in the same year.

In 2007, Owen composed the music for a Volvo advert, titled "The Hunt". The advert was created in partnership with Disney and the film series, The Pirates of the Caribbean.  It went on to win a Silver Cyber at Cannes.

A number of years later he composed music to launch BMW's newest SUV, the X6. The promo clip was titled "Experience." In the same year he was commissioned to write a 1950s style song for Braun. The commercial titled "Mafia" was filmed especially for the Cannes Lion Festival in 2009. In 2010, Owen composed the music for the Reebok advert, Zigtech. The advert featured Lewis Hamilton.

Owen wrote the music for the Nike teaser film "Dare to be Brazilian" marking the official launch of the 2014 World Cup Brazil kit.

In 2017, Owen created original music, including a re-imagining of Figaro's Aria from The Barber of Seville for the Heineken commercial "The Invention" The vocal solo was recorded in Rome by Italian operatic baritone Pietro Spagnoli.

Television
Much of Owens work has featured on television shows. His production music features in Celebrity Juice, Child of our Time, Come Dine with Me, Dancing with the Stars, The Oprah Winfrey Show, Location Location Location, The Rob Bryden Show, Songs of Praise, The One Show, Keeping up with the Kardashians and the UEFA Champions League.

Late 2015, DeWolfe Music released Owen's album Minimalist Soundscapes The opening track "Life's Reasons" was used by the BBC for the short film featuring Burntwood School who then went on to win the RIBA Sterling Prize that year.

Other works
More recently, Owen has written tracks for various production libraries including Sony/ATV, DeWolfe, West One and No Sheet Music. This includes the albums Eclectic Folkestra 1 and Eclectic Folkestra 2 published by De Wolfe Music. The opening track "Jumping Jim" has been used by CBeebies and Dettol.

He has composed a number of musical idents in his career. In 2003, Owen created the main theme and idents for Sky Italia from launch and they continue to use his channel theme. He was commissioned by Soundscape Music. Other idents have included ITV3 and ITV's Movie Premiere.

In 2016, Owen was commissioned by Microsoft Production Studios to write music for a short film featuring developer Saqib Sheikh and his intelligent API for the blind and visually impaired. The film was introduced by Satya Nadella at the Microsoft Build Keynote Day 1.

Film
Owens track “Blam” published by APM Music features in the 2014 film Nightcrawler starring Jake Gyllenhaal.

References

External links

English composers
Living people
English male composers
Musicians from Worcestershire
Year of birth missing (living people)